The Athens Metro is a rapid-transit system in Greece which serves the Athens urban area and parts of East Attica. Line 1 opened as a conventional steam railway in 1869 and electrified in 1904. In 1991, Attiko Metro S.A. constructed and extended Lines 2 and 3.
It has significantly changed Athens by providing a much-needed solution to the city's traffic and air pollution problem, as well as revitalising many of the areas it serves.
Extensions of existing lines are under development, as well as a new Line 4, whose central section began construction in October 2021.
The Athens Metro is actively connected with the other means of public transport, such as buses, trolleys, the Athens Tram and the Athens Suburban Railway. The Athens Metro is hailed for its modernity (mainly the newer lines 2, 3) and many of its stations feature works of art, exhibitions and displays of the archaeological remains found during its construction. Photography and video-taking is permitted across the whole network and street photographers often work in Athens Metro. This was the only metro system in Greece, until the Thessaloniki Metro begins operation in 2023.

History

Piraeus–Kifissia Railway
Until 28 January 2000, Line 1 was the only rapid-transit line in Athens. It was electrified in 1904. On the 4th of February 1885 Lavrion Square-Strofyli steam narrow gauge single-track mixed cargo and passenger railway line opened and was run at the time from Attiki Square to Kifissia through Iraklio. These originally mixed cargo and passenger railway lines gradually merged and converted to a rapid-transit system. The section between Kifissia and Strofyli was abandoned.

From 1869 to 1926 the line was operated by SAP. From 1926 to 1976 the line was operated by Hellenic Electric Railways (EIS). In 1976 the EIS was nationalized and renamed Athens-Piraeus Electric Railway Company (ISAP), which continued to operate what became line 1 of the Athens Metro until 16 June 2011.

1990s projects
Since the current Line 1 opened, the government has proposed many expansions to the subway network, including a 1963 plan for a fourteen-line subway network. Construction of Lines 2 and 3 began in November 1992 to decrease traffic congestion and improve Athens' air quality by reducing its smog level. Both lines were constructed underground. Lines 2 and 3, built by Attiko Metro S.A. and operated until 2011 by Attiko Metro Operations Company, are known respectively as the red and blue lines and were inaugurated in January 2000. Line 3 was extended to the Eleftherios Venizelos International Airport in summer 2004, and Line 2 was extended to Anthoupoli and Elliniko in 2013.

Consolidation
Until 17 June 2011, the operational management of the Athens Metro network was similar to that of the London Underground network before the creation of the London Passenger Transport Board and the absorption of the Metropolitan Railway on 1 July 1933. The Greek government attempted to absorb ISAP into Attiko Metro under Law 2669/1998 so the latter would be responsible for the whole network, but this initiative failed. Athens Metro operations were consolidated when the Greek government enacted Law 3920/2011, replacing AMEL, ISAP and Tram S.A. with Urban Rail Transport S.A. (STASY S.A.), a subsidiary of OASA S.A. (Athens Urban Transport Organisation S.A.).

Timeline

Infrastructure

Lines and stations

STASY owns and operates 62 of the 66 stations: three other stations (and ) belong to GAIAOSE and the  station belongs to the operator of the Athens International Airport.

Each line also has at least one connection with the Athens Suburban Railway, and the Athens Tram.

Line 2 and the Attiko Metro portion of Line 3 are entirely underground. Line 1 is primarily overground, with a tunnel section in central Athens. The airport section of Line 3, east of the tunnel portal near , is open. In the tunnel sections up and down lines share a common tunnel, except for approaches to stations with an island platform (such as Egaleo). Train maintenance facilities are located at Attiki, Faliro, Irini, Piraeus, Kifissia and Thissio for Line 1, and Doukissis Plakentias, Eleonas and Sepolia for Lines 2 and 3.

The Athens Metro's three lines carried approximately 1,353,000 passengers daily in 2010.

A network map of the Athens Metro system, that includes the three current lines, the under construction line 4, the tramway,the suburban railway and all the future under design extensions.

Rolling stock

The network uses standard gauge electric trains which in most places run on 750 V DC third rail, but the section of Line 3 running to the airport requires trains which can use overhead lines of 25 kV AC, 50 Hz.

The Athens Metro classifies rolling stock by "batch" for Line 1 and "generation" for Lines 2 and 3 because ISAP and AMEL used different classification systems for rolling stock before consolidation.

The eighth batch (introduced in 1983) is the oldest rolling stock in passenger service, while the third generation (introduced in 2013) is the latest rolling stock in passenger service. The eighth- and tenth-batch stock is externally similar, but the former has split-flap headsigns in Johnston typeface and a cream-and-green interior colour scheme. An extensive refurbishment programme is planned for the 8th batch, and to cover for trains undergoing refurbishment, up to five 1st generation Line 2/3 trains have been borrowed to operate on Line 1.
Line 1 halfsets have driving cabs at both ends, unlike the Line 2/3 halfsets which have a driving cab at the outer ends, but only basic driving apparatus for shunting purposes only at the inner ends; thus, they can only operate on their own inside depots.

 First series (delivery): 28 six-car electric multiple units made by Alstom–Siemens–Adtranz (2000); maximum speed 
 Second series (delivery): 21 six-car EMU made by Hanwha-Rotem-Mitsubishi.(2004). Seven of these trains can also operate on OSE lines with 25 kV AC − 50 Hz overhead electrification system and are used for airport service. All second-series trains are air-conditioned. Maximum speed 
 Third series: Athens Metro ordered 17 additional trains made by Hyundai Rotem.
 Four service hybrid locomotives made by Kaelble-Gmeinder-Siemens. They can operate from a third-rail 750 V DC system or their own diesel generators. They have a B-B configuration, with a maximum power of  under diesel traction and  under electric traction.
 One road-rail Unimog

Railcar codes: DM: driving motor car, DT: driving trailer, M: motor car, T: trailer, MD: motor car with auxiliary driving facility.

Signalling

Line 1 uses two-aspect red/green home signals, yellow/green distant signals and a passenger information system (PIS). The current system replaced 1950s-era semaphore signals.

Lines 2 and 3 use the Alstom automatic train supervision system (ATS) and a passenger information system (PIS). Two-aspect red/white colour signals are used at points and junctions only.

Fares

Fares are prepaid, either as short term tickets valid for 90 minutes, 24 hours, 3 days, 5 days, or as long term tickets. As of September 2020, there are two types of fare products, the ATH.ENA Ticket and ATH.ENA Card, both of which are validated using a contactless system (by scanning the ticket or card at the electronic validating machines). The tickets are valid on all modes of public transport in Athens except on trains and buses to the airport. Passengers cannot buy a fare on board the bus. To travel to or from the airport, passengers may buy a one-way ticket for €9 or a 3-day ticket for €20 which also includes unlimited local trips and a return trip to the airport.  Arrival at the airport without having paid the appropriate fare will incur a €72 fine, reduced to €36  if you can pay within 10 days. Term tickets are available in 30, 90, 180, and 365 day periods and are available only with a personalized ATH.ENA Card. Reduced fares are available for university students, seniors, disabled and persons under 18. During a fare control the passengers that are entitled to a reduced fare have to show ID card, student card or passport. Children under the age of 6 are entitled to travel for free with all means of transportation. On buses and trams the ticket or card must be validated only when entering the vehicle/car by scanning the ticket at the electronic validating machines. At metro or Suburban Railway stations, the ticket or card must be validated at the electronic gates when entering and exiting the station.

Archaeological excavations and exhibits 

During construction of the metro tunnels, artifacts of archaeological interest were discovered and rescue archaeology was employed. Teams of archaeologists worked ahead of, then with, engineers for six years, protecting and recording archaeological finds (streets, houses, cemeteries, sanctuaries, public workshops, foundry pits, kilns, aqueducts, wells, cisterns, drains and sewage tunnels). This afforded new insight into the city's ancient topography, through unprecedented infrastructure development combined with the study and preservation of archaeological data. Exhibitions of ancient artifacts or replicas are found at a number of metro stations, including Monastiraki and Syntagma.

Future
The Athens Metro masterplan, as presented in October 2022, consists of the following projects:

*The current Kifissia terminal will be demolished and rebuilt as an underground station.

**The Development Plan refers it as Line 4 branch but there are unofficial plans that this branch is part of the future Line 5.

If and when these projects are completed, the Athens Metro is expected to reach  in length and serve a total of 110 stations by 2040.

Line 4

A fourth line is planned for the Athens Metro and it has been incorporated in the roadmap of Athens's mass transit system since 2005. The cost of the entire project is estimated at 3.3 billion EUR. The recommendation is for lighter rolling stock than the type used in existing lines of Athens Metro which would operate automatically without a driver. In November 2020, Alstom was chosen to supply the line with 20 4-car automated Metropolis trains, operated under Urbalis 400 signalling system.

An invitation to tender for the construction of the first phase of Line 4 was issued in September 2018. The construction is expected to start by mid-2020 and the opening of the line by circa 2028. The estimated cost for constructing the first phase of the new line is 1.51 billion EUR. Currently, the project of the first phase is considered to follow a PPP scheme which might be extended for constructing the whole new line. An alternative solution is a mixed funding between the EIB and the Greek State. It is also a high-profile candidate project to be included in the Juncker Plan of EU that will include also the second phase of Line 4 of Athens Metro.

Long-term plan

This proposal evolved to form part of what is now the long-term Athens Metro Future Regulatory Plan (or the Souflias plan) on 13 April 2009, which called for an  network of eight lines and 200 stations.

See also
 Line 1 (Athens Metro)
 Line 2 (Athens Metro)
 Line 3 (Athens Metro)
 Line 4 (Athens Metro)
 Athens Mass Transit System
 Thessaloniki Metro

Notes

References

External links

Athens Metro Map on Google earth with geolocation
Urban Rail Transport Company (STASY S.A.)
Attiko Metro Company (Construction and Infrastructure)
Athens Urban Transport Organisation (OASA S.A.)
UrbanRail.Net – Athens Metro
CityRailTransit – Athens railway map (real distance)
Athens metro guide

 
Electric railways in Greece
Underground rapid transit in Greece
Rail transport articles in need of updating
750 V DC railway electrification
25 kV AC railway electrification
1869 establishments in Greece